The Church of the First Born of the Lamb of God, also known as the Church of the Lamb of God, was a violent Latter Day Saint group founded by Ervil LeBaron that is responsible for dozens of deaths over two decades. After his death, it was run by several of his sons.

Background

When Joseph Smith founded the Latter Day Saint movement, Benjamin F. Johnson was one of his earliest followers.  Johnson followed the church teaching and practiced polygamy, taking multiple wives.  When the Church of Jesus Christ of Latter-day Saints renounced polygamy, Johnson and his family, like many Mormon fundamentalists, continued the practice. In 1924, Johnson's grandson, Alma Dayer LeBaron, Sr. moved his family to Mexico, where the government showed no interest in prosecuting polygamists.  They settled near Colonia Juárez, Chihuahua.

Alma Dayer believed that Johnson was the rightful successor to Smith, and that Johnson had appointed Alma to follow him.    After Alma's death, several of his sons claimed to be his true successor.  In 1955, his son Joel founded The Church of the Firstborn of the Fulness of Times and named himself the president.  His brother Ervil became second-in-command, with full authority over their new settlement, known as Colonia LeBaron.  A third brother, Verlan, also held a high position in the church.

By 1967, tensions were rising between Joel and Ervil.  Ervil began advocating for the return of the former Mormon principle of blood atonement.  This required that a sinner must have their blood shed in order for them to have a place in heaven.  Essentially, it required the death penalty for actions deemed crimes by Ervil.  Joel refused to allow the practice into his church.

The brothers also argued about the fate of their second Mexican colony, a ranch known as Los Molinos, in Baja California, Mexico. Joel intended the land to support future church recruits.  Ervil wanted to develop the land as a resort.

Foundation and fratricide
By the late 1960s, Ervil LeBaron began preaching against his brother, accusing his brother of crimes against their faith.  Proclaiming that he was the true successor to his father, Ervil began the Church of the First Born of the Lamb of God and named himself the president.   Some of Joel's followers, including Daniel Ben Jordan and the Chynoweth and Rios families, switched their allegiance to Ervil.

In 1972, Ervil orchestrated the murder of his brother, the first victim of the blood atonement policy. One of the assassins, Daniel Ben Jordan, was later arrested for the murder, but he was released when witnesses were too afraid to testify against him.  The other killer, Gamaliel Rios, remained free.

To Ervil's surprise, Joel's followers did not flock to his side; instead they advocated for Ervil's arrest.  He was convicted of planning the murder but freed a year later by an appellate court.  While imprisoned, Ervil continued to release pamphlets and books insisting that he was the Mormon One Mighty and Strong and that, as God's representative on earth, he could decide who should die for their sins.

He was most interested in executing his brother Verlan, who Joel's followers had elected as their new leader.  Fearing for his life, Verlan had gone into hiding. In an effort to flush him out, on December 26, 1974, Ervil's underage thirteenth wife Rena Chynoweth and her brothers Mark and Duane Chynoweth raided Los Molinos.  They threw firebombs at houses and shot at residents, killing two young men and injuring 13. They failed in their primary goal; Verlan had just moved his families out of the colony to Nicaragua. Ervil was arrested for masterminding the raid, but was released due to lack of evidence.

Increasingly upset by the violence, Noemi Zarate, a wife of Bud Chynoweth (father of two of Ervil's wives), threatened to leave and go to the police. On Ervil's orders, his tenth wife Vonda White drove Zarate into the desert and killed her. Her body has never been found.

1975-1980
Ervil LeBaron moved part of his family to San Diego, California. He wrote letters to and visited many polygamist leaders, threatening their lives if they did not switch their allegiance to the Church of the Lamb of God and tithe accordingly. Robert Simons, a leader of a small polygamous sect in Utah, denounced Ervil after learning that Ervil wanted to marry one of Simons' wives. Simons was killed in April 1975 by Mark Chynoweth and Eddie Marston, on Ervil's orders.

That same year, another of his followers, Dean Vest, prepared to leave the group.  Ervil was already angry with Vest for refusing to sell a houseboat that he owned and tithe half of the proceeds to the cult.  On Ervil's orders, his tenth wife Vonda White executed Dean in her kitchen.  She was later convicted of the murder. Ervil told her that with this murder she had ensured her presence in heaven.

In 1977, Ervil also ordered the death of his pregnant teenage daughter Rebecca, the wife of Mark Chynoweth.  Angry that she had been separated from her toddler son, Rebecca threatened to go to the police about the group's activities.  A witness testified that her body was stuffed into the trunk of a car, and Ervil drove it around town for the afternoon; when someone commented that the car was riding low, he casually remarked that it must be because of Rebecca. When Rebecca's mother, Ervil's first wife Delfina, discovered that her daughter had been murdered on the orders of her husband, she strongly objected.  Another of her daughters, Lillian (who was also married to Mark Chynoweth) warned her that if she did not settle down and accept the righteousness of Rebecca's death, she would also be marked for blood atonement.  Believing that her son-in-law and daughter were preparing to murder her, Delfina and her youngest daughter snuck out of Lillian's house and fled to Mexico.

Ervil had never given up the idea of killing his brother Verlan.  He hatched a plan to flush Verlan out of hiding.  He convinced his now 18-year-old wife Rena Chynoweth and his stepdaughter Ramona Marston (a wife of Daniel Jordan) to kill Rulon C. Allred, the leader of the Apostolic United Brethren, one of the largest polygamist sects. Three of Ervil's other followers, including Ramon's brother Ed, attended the funeral with orders to kill Verlan and anyone else who got in their way. They aborted their mission when they realized that police were stationed all around the funeral area to protect the mourners.

Ervil was captured in Mexico and tried and convicted in the United States for planning Allred's murder. It was the first time he had been charged with a crime in the United States. Rena Chynoweth and Ramona Marston were acquitted by a jury for their role in the murder.

While he was incarcerated in Utah, he continued to write testaments for his followers.  One of these, the Book of New Covenants, contained a list of 50 people that Ervil marked for blood atonement. The book also contained a list of who should succeed Ervil as leader of the cult.

Ervil died in jail in 1981. His brother Verlan died in a car crash in Mexico several days later.

Arturo LeBaron
Ervil's book had named his eldest son, Arturo LeBaron, as his immediate successor.  Arturo was the son of Ervil's first wife, Delfina. Under Arturo, the cult openly embraced the criminal enterprises that they had previously dabbled in, specifically auto theft.

Ervil's wife Lorna Chynoweth became disillusioned and decided to leave the cult.  On Arturo's orders, she was killed by her son Andrew.

Another of Ervil's followers, Leo Evoniuk, also claimed to have been given the authority to lead the church.  After months of arguing, the men agreed to meet to resolve their differences.  At that meeting, Arturo was murdered, most likely by cult followers Gamaliel and Raul Rios.

During Arturo's reign, some of the group's adherents drifted away.  Rena Chynoweth moved away with her two small children.  Her brothers, Mark and Duane, and their mother Thelma moved to Texas. Daniel Jordan moved his family to Utah.

Heber LeBaron
After Arturo's death, leadership of the cult fell to the next son on Ervil's list, 20-year-old Heber LeBaron. At this point, the cult primarily comprised the living wives (except for Delfina and Rena), children, and stepchildren of Ervil LeBaron.

Heber revived the policy of blood atonement, and over the next few years group members took revenge on those they blamed for Arturo's death.  Gamaliel and Raul Rios were killed.  Their two sisters who had been married to Ervil LeBaron disappeared. Heber had accused the women of knowing about Arturo's murder in advance, and authorities believe cult members killed them. Evoniuk was killed in 1987 by cult members.

Although Heber did not spend a great deal of time proselytizing about religion to his followers, he fully embraced plural marriage and used it to tighten his influence over the group's members.  In 1983, he married two women from Guatemela.  Within the next few years he also married several of his half-sisters and stepsisters, including Patricia LeBaron.  To gain favor with Mexican politicians and get cover for the family's criminal enterprises, he sometimes pimped out his sisters/wives.

In 1987, the group ostensibly split into two.  Heber took Ervil's wives and the teenage children with him to the United States, where they established a large auto theft ring.  The younger children stayed in Mexico with Heber's younger brother Aaron (son of Lorna Chynoweth).  In August 1987, Aaron took the younger children to Daniel Jordan's home, asking for shelter and sanctuary from the other family members.  Although Jordan did not fully trust Aaron, he allowed them all to move in.  Two months later, Jordan took his wives and children and the LeBaron children with him on a camping trip.  He was shot and killed at the campground.  A week later, Aaron was arrested after pulling a gun on Jordan's wives and children and telling them he had been given a revelation giving him authority over the family.

On June 27, 1988, the cult targeted three names that were prominently on Ervil LeBaron's blood atonement list.  Within the span of a few minutes around 4 pm, cult members killed four people in three different locations in Texas.  Ed Martson, Ervil's stepson, was killed in Irving by another stepson, Douglas Barlow.  Heber, accompanied by his half-sister and wife Patricia, shot Mark Chynoweth at his appliance repair shop in northern Houston.  Another brother, Richard, killed Duane Chynoweth and his eight-year-old daughter Jennifer after luring them to an empty house on Rena Street in Houston.

A few weeks later, Heber and 4 of his siblings were arrested in Arizona for auto theft. Shortly after, Aaron and two others were arrested in Chicago and charged with having false identification paper.

Richard eventually pled guilty to his role in the so-called 4 O'Clock Murders and agreed to testify against his siblings.  Heber, Patricia, and Douglas Barlow were convicted. Aaron LeBaron and their sister Jacqueline Tarsa LeBaron were indicted for helping plan the murders but couldn't be found.

Six of the younger children, aged 12–18, were placed in separate foster homes in Utah.  Authorities hoped that by separating them and showing them a normal life, the children could be deprogrammed and end the cycle of violence.  All of the children disappeared from their foster homes on a single night at the end of September 1989.

Notes

References

Sources

Further Information

Janet Bennion (2004). Desert Patriarchy: Mormon and Mennonite Communities in the Chihuahua Valley (Tucson: University of Arizona Press) 
Ben Bradlee Jr. and Dale Van Atta (1981). Prophet of Blood: The Untold Story of Ervil Lebaron and the Lambs of God (New York: Putnam), 
Jesse Hyde (Host) (2022). "Deliver Us From Ervil" [Audio Podcast]. In iHeart. Novel. https://www.iheart.com/podcast/1119-deliver-us-from-ervil-96084334/

Mormon fundamentalist denominations
Churches in Mexico
History of Chihuahua (state)
Christian organizations established in 1972
1972 establishments in Mexico
Christian denominations established in the 20th century
LeBaron family
Religiously motivated violence in Mexico
Religiously motivated violence in the United States
Mormonism and violence
Cults